The Maguindanao division plebiscite was held in the province of Maguindanao, Philippines on September 17, 2022, more than four months after the May 9 national and local elections, after having been postponed from its planned plebiscite in or before August 2021. As required by Republic Act No. 11550, it was conducted to seek the consent by the residents of Maguindanao on the proposal to divide the province into two separate provinces that will henceforth be named Maguindanao del Norte and Maguindanao del Sur.

The proposal was overwhelmingly accepted (99%) by the electorate, and declared official on September 18, 2022. It paved the way for the division of the province.

Background

Shariff Kabunsuan 

The traces of the proposed division goes back into the formation of Shariff Kabunsuan. Shariff Kabunsuan was established through Muslim Mindanao Autonomy Act No. 201 by the former ARMM Regional Legislative Assembly. It was composed of 11 municipalities: Barira, Buldon, Datu Blah T. Sinsuat, Kabuntalan, Matanog, Northern Kabuntalan, Parang, Sultan Kudarat, Sultan Mastura, and Upi with Datu Odin Sinsuat as its designated capital. Cotabato City became part of Shariff Kabunsuan, but for geographical and statistical purposes only. However, the province was short-lived due to the Supreme Court case Sema v. COMELEC. Citing the cause was that only Congress shall have the power to create legislative districts, and in turn, cities and provinces.

Legislative history 

In 2017, former Congresswoman of 1st District of Maguindanao Bai Sandra Sema filed House Bill No. 5185 which seeks to divide Maguindanao into two: namely Maguindanao North and Maguindanao South. It has the same composition of the former province of Shariff Kabunsuan with Datu Odin Sinsuat as its designated capital. However, it did not get past the 17th Congress.

At the 18th Congress in August 2019, Maguindanao's 2nd congressional district representative Esmael Mangudadatu filed House Bill No. 3405 in order to create Maguindanao North. Its municipalities composed of former municipalities of Shariff Kabunsuan, along with Datu Anggal Midtimbang and Talitay (Sultan Sumagka). However, its designated capital was the municipality of Sultan Kudarat, which differed from the other bills filed.

In September 2019, the current Congressman of 1st District of Maguindanao Datu Roonie Sinsuat Sr. filed House Bill No. 4840 in order to create Western Maguindanao. It was also composed of former municipalities of Shariff Kabunsuan, along with additional municipalities of Talitay (Sultan Sumagka) and South Upi.

Consolidated as House Bill No. 6413, it became the final version of the act that splits Maguindanao into two: Northern Maguindanao and Southern Maguindanao. Northern Maguindanao consists of 12 municipalities: 
 
Meanwhile, Southern Maguindanao consists of 24 municipalities:
 
Northern Maguindanao resembles the original territory of Shariff Kabunsuan with the addition of Talitay (Sultan Sumagka). The final designated capital for Northern Maguindanao will be Datu Odin Sinsuat. The capital of Southern Maguindanao will be Buluan. The bill was passed by the 18th Congress on February 27, 2020.

Senator Francis Tolentino co-sponsored the House Bill into the Senate, citing the cause of better delivery of government services within the province. The same sentiment was also shared by Senator Miguel Zubiri.  The bill was amended by the Senate on March 9, 2021, and which the amendments were concurred in by the House of Representatives on March 22, 2021.

Republic Act No. 11550 
On May 21, 2021, then President Rodrigo Duterte signed Republic Act No. 11550. 
 Section 54 of the law mandates all obligations, debts, and assets shall be shared or paid equally by the newly created provinces.
 Section 50 of the law makes Maguindanao del Sur the mother province and the elected governor of the original Maguindanao province shall assume as governor of Maguindanao del Sur. The vice governor or any highest ranking official of the Maguindanao Provincial Board who is a resident of Maguindanao del Norte will serve as acting governor.  In the event that a resident of Maguindanao del Norte is elected as governor of Maguindanao, he/she will only hold office until a resident of Maguindanao del Sur will take over through the next local election. All other vacancies in the provincial board will be appointed by the President of the Philippines.
 Section 48 states that the expense of the provincial division plebiscite shall be borne out of the budget of the original Maguindanao province and neither the BARMM government nor the national government.
 Section 11 mandates all elected officials to hold office in the designated provincial capital stated in Section 5. They may opt to hold office at any municipality outside the capital within the province for a period of not more than seven working days in any given month. 
 Section 9 also states that Cotabato City, an independent-component city no longer under the jurisdiction of the undivided Maguindanao, is to be part of the congressional district of Maguindanao del Norte.

Preparation

Scheduling 
Presidential spokesperson Harry Roque announced that President Duterte signed into law the bill dividing Maguindanao on May 27, 2021. The Maguindanao provincial government later stated that they have set aside 120 million pesos for the plebiscite, and that they were waiting for the Commission on Elections to set the day of the plebiscite. The enabling law mandated that COMELEC should schedule the plebiscite around August 2021, but COMELEC decided to postpone it until after the 2022 general election.

On June 22, 2022, the COMELEC en banc approved the date for the plebiscite on September 17, 2022, to ratify the law dividing the province into Maguindanao del Norte and Maguindanao del Sur.

In August 2022, the commission started printing of ballots for this plebiscite and plebiscites in three other areas. A total of 818,790 ballots will be printed.

Question 
The question is written in Filipino both in Latin letters and in Jawi or Arabic letters. Voters were opted to write in "yes" or "oo", or in Jawi as "وو" or "يِسْ" if they agree; or "no" or "hindi" or in Jawi as "هِنْدِ" or "نُ" if they oppose the proposal.: 
In Filipino written in Latin Letters:

In Filipino written in Jawi Letters:

English Translation:

Campaign 
Local officials, including representative from Maguindanao's 1st district Bai Dimple Mastura, encouraged voters to vote for division. Provincial administrator Cyrus Torreña appealed to the members of the Maguindanao Provincial Board to support the division.

The United Bangsamoro Justice Party, the political arm of the Moro Islamic Liberation Front, announced it is for division. Mohagher Iqbal urged all of their members to vote "yes", saying "Dividing the province will bring the government closer to the people."

A week before the plebiscite a group called "The Interfaith for Peace and Clean Election" requested to the commission to postpone the election. Its coordinator Goldy Omelio said that many of the residents do not know of the upcoming plebiscite. Omelio added that politicians for division were aggressive in campaigning for division.

Meanwhile, the Roman Catholic Archdiocese of Cotabato's prelate Angelito Lampon encouraged the faithful to vote, without stating preference on whether to divide or not. Lampon said that the plebiscite is a mere formality due to lack of clear opposition to division. He stressed that what happens next, if the new provincial officials will be elected or appointed, "is more dangerous".

Results 
The Commission on Elections (COMELEC) reported that all voting precincts opened on time except one in Talayan, wherein it only opened thirty minutes late.

COMELEC reported no election-related incidents citing statements from law enforcement authorities. Poll watchdog National Citizens' Movement for Free Elections (NAMFREL), with other groups, described the plebiscite processes as smooth and peaceful; cited generally quick voting process in polling sites and transparency in counting and canvassing of votes.

While both NAMFREL and the poll watchdog Legal Network for Truthful Elections (LENTE) reported common problems encountered by voters, they observed in voting centers that COVID-19 protocols were not much enforced and followed.

As expected, results were announced by COMELEC on September 18. Majority of voters favored the division, according to the initial data. The voter turnout is the second highest for province-wide plebiscites, only behind that of the 1998 plebiscite creating and taking Compostela Valley from Davao del Norte. Meanwhile, the plebiscite is said to be the most participated in terms of number of registered and actual voters.

The voter turnout exceeded a prediction by COMELEC which was at least 60%. Earlier, NAMFREL observed a low voter turnout especially in Upi and Buluan; however in Talitay, about 80% of voters were reportedly already voted by morning and despite a report that some voters did not participate due to security reasons, the plebiscite had been peaceful. Observations from LENTE stated that voting influx peaked 30 minutes after the polling precincts opened, same duration later than expected.

Official results show eight municipalities, all from the proposed Maguindanao del Sur, unanimously voting for division: Ampatuan, Datu Abdullah Sangki, Datu Anggal Midtimbang, Datu Montawal, Mamasapano, Paglat, Shariff Saydona Mustapha and Talayan.

By municipality

By proposed province

Aftermath 
After voters voted overwhelmingly for division, COMELEC will issue a legal opinion on who will be leading the two provinces. The organic act presupposes that the plebiscite was held after the 2022 local elections; however, due to COMELEC's preparation for that, the plebiscite was done after it. Chairman George Garcia said that COMELEC will not participate in determining who would be the new officials, saying that under the Local Government Code, it would be the Department of the Interior and Local Government (DILG). 

Former Maguindanao governor Mariam Mangudadatu became governor of Maguindanao del Sur, while her former vice governor, Ainee Sinsuat, was named Maguindanao del Norte governor. The Bangsamoro regional government has refused to recognized the officials, taking note the "legal controversy" arising from postponing the plebiscite.

On January 9, 2023, a final ceremony for the old Maguindanao was held at the capitol grounds in Buluan, Maguindanao del Sur, marking as well the end of a 60-day transition period for the two new provincial governments. Separate official sessions and work later began.

References

External links 
 Republic Act No. 11550, Charter of Maguindanao del Norte and Maguindanao del Sur
 Resolution No. 10816, Rules and Regulations Governing the Conduct of the September 17, 2022, Plebiscite to Ratify the Division of the Province of Maguindanao
 Re: September 17, 2022 Plebiscite to Ratify the Division of the Province of Maguindanao into 2 Districts and Independent Provinces, to be known as the Provinces of Maguindanao del Norte and Maguindanao del Sur (RA11550; May 27, 2021)

History of Maguindanao del Norte
History of Maguindanao del Sur
Politics of Maguindanao del Norte
Politics of Maguindanao del Sur
Provincial plebiscites in the Philippines
Administrative division referendums
Maguindanao
2022 elections in the Philippines
2022 in the Philippines
September 2022 events in the Philippines